Ma Liang (187–222), courtesy name Jichang, was an official serving under the warlord Liu Bei during the late Eastern Han dynasty of China. Since he was young, Ma Liang was famous for his exceptional talent, with Chen Shou describing him as one of Shu's best officials; however, he was killed in battle at the age of 35 years during the Battle of Xiaoting. He was the elder brother of Ma Su and served in the state of Shu Han as one of the founding emperor Liu Bei's Palace Attendants during the early Three Kingdoms period.

Life
Ma Liang was from Yicheng County, Xiangyang, which is present-day Yicheng, Hubei. He had four brothers – Ma Su was one of them. Ma Liang was famous for his talent. He had white strands of hair in his eyebrows. There was a saying in Ma Liang's hometown to describe him and his brothers: "Of the five changs in the Ma family, White Brows is the most liang."

Around 209, when the warlord Liu Bei took charge of Jing Province (covering present-day Hubei and Hunan) after the death of its Inspector, Liu Qi, he recruited Ma Liang to serve as an Assistant Officer under him. Later in 211, when Liu Bei left Jing Province for an expedition in Yi Province (covering present-day Sichuan and Chongqing), Ma Liang remained behind in Jing Province. Ma Liang was a close friend of Liu Bei's strategist Zhuge Liang and they were sworn brothers.

He once wrote a letter to Zhuge Liang, who was in Yi Province at the time, to praise and encourage him. The letter was written as such: 

Ma Liang was later promoted to the position of a Senior Clerk in the office of the General of the Left.

Ma Liang was later appointed as an emissary to meet the warlord Sun Quan, Liu Bei's ally. Before his mission to Wu, Ma Liang spoke to Zhuge Liang: "Now that I'm sent by the state with the mission to bring harmony and friendship between our two nations. May I have the chance to be introduced by you to General Sun Quan?" Zhuge Liang answered: "You ought to try writing something yourself." And so Ma Liang wrote a draft that said: "Our wise lord sends his advisor Ma Liang to convey my respects, bring gifts and extend prosperity to our friendship thereby continue on the praiseworthy legacy of Kunwu (昆吾) and Shiwei (豕韋). I'm a fortunate man of some talent from Jing and Chu region. Rarely, I'm rash in action and yet I have the virtue of seeing matters through to the end. With a calm heart, I turn my head toward you hoping you deign to accept me and give me assistance so I can accomplish my mission." Sun Quan received and treated Ma Liang very respectfully.

In 221, after the collapse of the Eastern Han dynasty, Liu Bei declared himself emperor and established the state of Shu Han. Ma Liang was appointed as a Palace Attendant in Shu. Later that year, Liu Bei launched a campaign against Sun Quan, leading to the Battle of Xiaoting. Ma Liang was tasked with persuading the tribal peoples in Wuling (武陵; around present-day Wuling District, Changde, Hunan) to join Liu Bei and he succeeded in his mission. The army's advance until they arrived at Xiaoting in Yidao, there Liu Bei extended his camps closely linked to each other. While Ma Liang following the road to Henshan (佷山) was further sent to oversee and manage the affairs of the Yi and Man tribes of Wuling. Liu Bei was eventually defeated by Sun Quan's general Lu Xun at the Battle of Xiaoting in 222 and Ma Liang was killed in action. Later, after he managed to retreat to Baidicheng (in present-day Fengjie County, Chongqing) safely, Liu Bei appointed Ma Liang's son, Ma Bing, as a Cavalry Commandant.

Appraisal

Chen Shou, who wrote Ma Liang's biography in the Records of the Three Kingdoms (Sanguozhi), appraised Ma Liang as follows: "Ma Liang was incorruptible, honest and was praised as an outstanding elite. He was worthy to be called a lingshi (令士; a virtuous scholarly gentleman)... Along with Dong He, Liu Ba, Chen Zhen and Dong Yun, he was one of the best officials in Shu."

In Romance of the Three Kingdoms
Ma Liang is a minor character in the 14th-century historical novel Romance of the Three Kingdoms, He joins Liu Bei under Yi Ji's recommendation along with his younger brother Ma Su. Then, he advised Liu Bei to have Liu Qi appointed as Governor of Jing Province to satisfy the people while he conquers the Southern Commandery. During the conquest of Yi, he stays behind and act as Guan Yu's main civil advisor acting as a voice of reason during the negotiation with Wu and playing weiqi against Guan Yu during Hua Tuo's famous operation.

See also
 Lists of people of the Three Kingdoms

Notes

References

 Chen, Shou (3rd century). Records of the Three Kingdoms (Sanguozhi).
 Chang Qu (4th century). Chronicles of Huayang (Huayang Guo Zhi).
 
 Pei, Songzhi (5th century). Annotations to Records of the Three Kingdoms (Sanguozhi zhu).

187 births
222 deaths
Politicians from Xiangyang
Officials under Liu Bei
Three Kingdoms diplomats
Shu Han politicians
Han dynasty politicians from Hubei
Han dynasty diplomats
Three Kingdoms people killed in battle